Rodgers Crossing Dam was a major dam proposed for the Kings River in Central California. The project was pushed during the 1960s and 1970s by the Kings River Conservation District (KRCD) to provide flood control and irrigation water supply. The estimated annual yield would be .

The purpose was to nearly double the storage capacity on the Kings River, as the existing Pine Flat Dam is unable to provide the high degree of flood protection for which it was originally built.

During the 1980s, the Rodgers Crossing dam was dropped due to poor economic justifications, and pushback from conservationists and the tourism sector who did not want to see the Kings River, a popular whitewater run, flooded by a reservoir. In 1987, a compromise was reached as the Kings River was incorporated into the National Wild and Scenic Rivers System, with the Rodgers Crossing dam site placed under "unified federal protection" that would require an act of Congress to overturn if the dam were to be built in the future.

See also
List of dams and reservoirs in California

References

Dams in the Tulare Basin
Kings River (California)
Dams in California
Cancelled hydroelectric power stations